William Hanley (1931–2012) was an American author, playwright, and screenwriter.

William or Bill Hanley may also refer to:

Bill Hanley (ice hockey) (1915–1990), Canadian ice hockey administrator
Bill Hanley (rancher) (1861–1935), American pioneer and rancher in Oregon
Bill Hanley (sound engineer) (born 1937), sound engineer at the Woodstock festival, 1969
William A. Hanley (1886–1966), American mechanical engineer